Shooting at the 2008 Summer Paralympics consisted of twelve events. The competition was held in the Beijing Shooting Range Hall from 7 September to 12 September.

Classification
Paralympic shooters are classified according to the extent of their disability. The classification system allows shooters to compete against others with a similar level of function.

Shooting classifications are:
SH1 - competitors who do not need a shooting stand
SH2 - competitors who use a shooting stand to support the firearm's weight.

Events
For each of the events below, medals were contested for one or more of the above classifications. After each classification is given the date that the event was contested.

Men's 10 m air pistol
 SH1 - 7 September
Men's 10 m air rifle standing
 SH1 - 8 September
Men's 50 m free rifle 3×40
 SH1 - 10 September
Women's 10 m air pistol
 SH1 - 8 September
Women's 10 m air rifle standing
 SH1 - 7 September
Women's 50 m sport rifle 3×20
 SH1 - 9 September
Mixed 25 m sport pistol
 SH1 - 10 September
Mixed 50 m free pistol
 SH1 - 12 September
Mixed 10 m air rifle prone
 SH1 - 11 September
 SH2 - 9 September
Mixed 10 m air rifle standing
 SH2 - 11 September
Mixed 50 m free rifle prone
 SH1 - 12 September

Participating countries
There were 140 athletes (96 male, 44 female) from 44 nations taking part in this sport.

Medal summary

Medal table

This ranking sorts countries by the number of gold medals earned by their shooters (in this context a nation is an entity represented by a National Paralympic Committee). The number of silver medals is taken into consideration next and then the number of bronze medals. If, after the above, countries are still tied, equal ranking is given and they are listed alphabetically.

Medalists

References

External links
Official Site of the 2008 Summer Paralympics

 
2008
2008 Summer Paralympics events
Paralympics
Shooting competitions in China